The 1969 Wittenberg Tigers football team was an American football team that represented Wittenberg University in the Ohio Athletic Conference (OAC) during the 1969 NCAA College Division football season. In their first year under head coach Dave Maurer, the Tigers compiled a perfect 10–0 record, won the OAC championship, and defeated William Jewell, 27–21, in the Amos Alonzo Stagg Bowl.

Linebacker Larry Peacock was selected by the Associated Press as a first-team player on the 1969 All-OAC football team. Five others were named to the second team: offensive guard Tom Young; running back Darryl Herring; defensive end Denny Yontz; defensive tackle bill Bibbee; and defensive back Jack Mackan. Quarterback Rocky Alt received honorable mention.

The 1969 season was the conclusion of a decade in which Wittenberg compiled a record of 69–9–1.

Schedule

References

Wittenberg
Wittenberg Tigers football seasons
Wittenberg Tigers football
College football undefeated seasons